The Gallery of HMS 'Calcutta' (Portsmouth), also known as Officer and Ladies on Board HMS Calcutta, is an 1876 oil painting by James Tissot.  It depicts two ladies in fashionable clothing and a young naval lieutenant, standing on the quarter gallery at the stern of the Royal Navy warship HMS Calcutta.  The painting is held by the Tate Gallery in London and measures .

Background
HMS Calcutta was an 84-gun second rate ship of the line, built from teak in Bombay in 1831.  After a period in reserve, she was recommissioned in 1855 to serve in the Baltic in the Crimean War, and then served in the Second Opium War in the Far East in 1856-8.  She was the British ship of the line to visit Japan in 1858.  She became a gunnery training ship in 1865 in Portsmouth Dockyard.  Astern of the Calcutta was the hulk of HMS Queen Charlotte which housed the navy's gunnery school, HMS Excellent. She was later moved to Devonport, Devon, after HMS Excellent was moved ashore.

Tissot was a French painter.  He left Paris after the Franco-Prussian War and resided in London from 1871.  He knew James McNeill Whistler and Edgar Degas, but turned away from Impressionism,  and made mainly portraits and genre paintings of the Victorian upper classes in a more polished academic style.

Description
The painting is typical of Tissot's work, depicting his subjects with almost photographic realism, with an ambiguous narrative that hints at risqué behaviour among the wealthy classes approaching or transgressing boundaries of propriety.  

Tissot's work depicts two women with a young man in a flirtatious situation, but with a dangerous sensual undercurrent of moral uncertainty.  The man is dressed plainly in the uniform of a junior naval officer.  Each woman is wearing a fashionable gauzy white dress decorated with bows and ribbons, with a tightly fitting bodice over a corset and full skirts below the hips .  

One woman, in a dress decorated with yellow ribbons, is leaning over the railing of the ship's quarter gallery, turning her head away as she hides her face from the naval officer behind her fan.  In the European hand fans in the 18th century language of the fan, an open fan over left ear indicates "do not betray our secret".  Her hourglass figure is echoed by the curves of the gallery's iron railings. Tissot's reference to HMS Calcutta may be making a punning on the French phrase "Quel cul tu as" ("What an arse you have").  Another woman in similar white dress with yellow ribbons appears in Tissot's 1876 painting Summer. 

The second woman in the painting, wearing a dress with blue ribbons, may be a chaperone, or possibly the officer's wife: he stands beside her, and wears a wedding ring, but he only has eyes for the first woman.  The overdressed woman have a touch of vulgarity.  The presence of others in the party is suggested by a line of chairs beside the windows of the gallery: perhaps they are sitting out a dance at a ball on board.  Several troop ships are in the background, under smoky grey skies.  

Tissot pays attention to the details of the women's clothing and the ship's railings.  His realistic style takes its sense of colour and light from the Impressionists, but the asymmetric composition may be influenced by Japanese printmaking. 

Tissot made a drypoint version of the work in 1876, reproduced as an etching, with the subtitle Memory of a Ball on Board ("La Galerie du 'Calcutta' (Souvenir d'un bal à bord)").  It was printed in The Graphic magazine with the title "Souvenir of a Ball on Shipboard".

Reception
Tissot's elegant depictions of passing fashions in sophisticated London society, with their ambiguous undercurrents, were criticised as immoral and superficial.  Oscar Wilde criticised Tissot and his "hard unscrupulousness in painting uninteresting objects in uninteresting ways".  Henry James contemptuously described The Gallery of HMS Calcutta as "hard, vulgar and banal".  

The painting was exhibited at the Grosvenor Gallery in London in 1877, after it had been sold to Scottish painter John Robertson Reid.  It was later sold to Henry Trengrouse.  After his death, it was bought by the Leicester Galleries in London in 1929 for 16 guineas, and then sold to Samuel Courtauld, who donated it to the Tate Gallery in 1936.

Notes

References
 Victorian Vulgarity: Taste in Verbal and Visual Culture, edited by Susan David Bernstein, Elsie B. Michie, p.180-182
 Hughes, C. "Henry James and the Art of Dress", 2001.
 Marshall, Nancy Rose. James Tissot: Victorian Life, Modern Love. Malcolm Warner, p.85-87
 James Tissot, Summer (Portrait), 1876, Tate
 La Galerie du 'Calcutta' (Souvenir d'un Bal à Bord) Allinson Gallery

1877 paintings
Paintings by James Tissot
Collection of the Tate galleries
Maritime paintings